Call the Time Eternity is the third album from the band Tweaker.

Track listing

Personnel
Chris Vrenna: producer and performer
Jesse Hall: producer and performer

2012 albums
Tweaker (band) albums
Albums produced by Chris Vrenna
Waxploitation Records albums